Fun on a Weekend is a 1947 American comedy film written and directed by Andrew L. Stone. The film stars Eddie Bracken, Priscilla Lane, Tom Conway, Allen Jenkins, Arthur Treacher, Clarence Kolb and Fritz Feld. The film was released on May 15, 1947, by United Artists.

Plot

A poor couple try get-rich-quick schemes.

Cast 
Eddie Bracken as Pete Porter 
Priscilla Lane as Nancy Crane
Tom Conway as Jefferson Van Orsdale Jr.
Allen Jenkins as Joe Morgan
Arthur Treacher as Benjamin O. Moffatt
Clarence Kolb as Quigley Quackenbush
Fritz Feld as Sergei Stroganoff
Alma Kruger as Mrs. Van Orsdale
Russell Hicks as John Biddle
Richard Hageman as cyrus Cowperwaithe
Lester Allen as Hot Dog Vendor

References

External links 
 

1947 films
American black-and-white films
Films directed by Andrew L. Stone
United Artists films
1947 comedy films
American comedy films
1940s English-language films
1940s American films